is a former Japanese football player.

Club statistics

References

External links

1986 births
Living people
Ryutsu Keizai University alumni
Association football people from Kanagawa Prefecture
People from Hiratsuka, Kanagawa
Japanese footballers
J1 League players
J2 League players
Yokohama F. Marinos players
Mito HollyHock players
Association football defenders